Jean-Marie Conrath is a French Olympic long-distance runner. He represented his country in the men's 5000 meters at the 1976 Summer Olympics. His time was a 13:34.39.

References

1952 births
Living people
French male long-distance runners
Olympic athletes of France
Athletes (track and field) at the 1976 Summer Olympics
20th-century French people